The Taiping Heavenly Kingdom developed a complicated peerage system for noble ranks.

King/Prince 
Wang (王, lit. "king" or "prince") was the highest title of nobility, often hereditary, ranked just below the Heavenly King. There were five ranks of wang:

Non-hereditary nobility ranks 
Below the king or prince, there were six ranks of nobility in Taiping Heavenly Kingdom: E (義 Yì), An (安 Ān), Fu (福 Fú), Yen (燕 Yān), Yü (豫 Yù) and Hou (侯 Hóu). The nobility titles were not hereditary.

E and An were most highest ranks of the nobility, once they were very noble titles of the Taiping Heavenly Kingdom. If the Heavenly King wanted to promote someone, he gave the person either E or An. However, this rule was challenged after 1860 because the nobility titles had been given too freely.

Notable people 
Chen Yucheng was titled Cheng Tian Yi (成天義) in 1857
Liang Chengfu was titled Zeng Tian Yi (則天義) in 1860
Tan Shaoguang was titled Jian Tian Yi (建天義) in 1861
Ye Yenlai was titled Sho Tian An (受天安) in 1857
Hong Rengan was titled Gan Tian Fu (干天福) in 1859
Qin Rigang was titled Ding Tian Yan (頂天燕) in 1856
 was titled Hu Tian Yu (護天豫) in 1854

See also 
 Royal and noble ranks of the Qing dynasty

Notes

References 

Chinese nobility
Taiping Rebellion